Peter Jackson (3 July 1861 – 13 July 1901) was an Australian heavyweight boxer who had a significant international career. Jackson was inducted into the International Boxing Hall of Fame in the inaugural 1990 class, as well as being the 2004 inductee for the Australian National Boxing Hall of Fame in the Pioneers category.

Early life

Jackson was born in Christiansted on the island Saint Croix, which was then the capital of the Danish West Indies (subsequently, part of the U.S. Virgin Islands). His family originally came from Montego Bay, Jamaica. His father, also called Peter Jackson, was a warehouseman and the grandson of a freed slave who had been owned by a planter with the surname of Jackson. Born a free man, Peter was in principle (at least) a Danish citizen before he gained Australian citizenship. Jackson had a good primary school education before becoming a mariner. Originally working on ships as a deckhand in the Sydney Docks since he was 14, he used his fists to quell a mutiny. This garnered him some notoriety and brought him to the attention of Larry Foley which started his career in boxing.

Professional career

Jackson won the Australian heavyweight title in 1886 with a knockout of Tom Lees in the 30th round. Jackson was at one stage a pupil of "The Black Diamond" Jack Dowridge, a Barbadian immigrant who pioneered boxing in Queensland, Australia. Among Dowridge's other pupils was "Gentleman Jack" John Reid McGowan, a fellow Australian National Boxing Hall of Fame Inductee. After establishing his boxing career, and like many of Australia's best boxers of this era, Jackson left for America. He arrived in San Francisco on 12 May 1888. and promptly beat "Old Chocolate" Godfrey to gain the World Colored Heavyweight Championship. During his stay in America, Jackson frequently sparred with Lees. Jackson would become an instructor at the California Athletic Club in San Francisco. He was considered one of the most "scientific" boxers of his day due to his footwork and technical proficiency.

Jackson would once again embark on to strange lands after a year in America, leaving that country for Great Britain. Jackson fought for a 1,000 pounds and the inaugural British Commonwealth title against Jem Smith, winning due to the latter's use of wrestling tactics in the second round. Later that year, during a short stay in Dublin, Jackson challenged anyone to stay in the ring with him for 4 rounds. Local champion Peter Maher, who was 20 years old at the time, was the man who took up his bet. Jackson thoroughly beat him in 3 rounds. Maher would go on to have a successful career, winning over 100 bouts. During Jackson's later years there was talk of a rematch against Maher that never materialized.

Jackson repeatedly tried to secure a fight against world champion John L. Sullivan to no avail. Sullivan cited the color bar as the reason for his refusal, claiming he would never fight a black man. Although there is no data to support that claim since Sullivan had on several occasions been scheduled to fight Black fighters such as "Old Chocolate", George Godfrey and a fighter named "Johnson" whose first name has been lost to history. The Godfrey bout was broken up by police as both men were stripped and ready to fight. On 21 May 1891, in Benicia, California Jackson fought the future world champion James Corbett. The match with Corbett went 61 rounds before it was declared no contest, as both boxers were too exhausted to continue. Jackson's last defense of his Commonwealth title came against his long-time rival and fellow Australian Frank Slavin. Both Slavin and Jackson had trained under Larry Foley and a real feud had existed between them for several years, due to Slavin's racism and a romantic triangle with a woman named Josie Leon. Although they had brawled before, this was the first and only professional bout between them. After a frenetic start to the fight, Jackson would gain the upper hand en route to a 10th-round knockout of Slavin.

After a long hiatus in which he only took part in exhibitions, he lost a bout to the powerfully built James J. Jeffries. Jeffries was another great boxer who would hold the championship of the world in the early 1900s.

Life after boxing

Jackson gained some fame during his stay in America. He stated his desire to play Othello, but it never came to fruition. However, he starred in a touring production of Uncle Tom's Cabin. Despite his celebrity, Jackson would run into financial troubles following his retirement from the ring. Jackson's health rapidly decayed following his bout against Jeffries, making it impossible for him to box. Several benefits were held in order to send him back to Australia.

Jackson died of tuberculosis in Roma, Queensland and was buried at Toowong Cemetery. A short time after becoming the first black heavyweight champion of the world in 1908, "The Galveston Giant" Jack Johnson, made a pilgrimage to Jackson's grave, a measure of the respect in which the man was held not only in Queensland, but in the boxing community worldwide. Jackson's tomb is emblazoned with the words "This was a man".

Professional boxing record
All information in this section is derived from BoxRec, unless otherwise stated.

Official record

All newspaper decisions are officially regarded as “no decision” bouts and are not counted in the win/loss/draw column.

Unofficial record

Record with the inclusion of newspaper decisions in the win/loss/draw column.

See also 

 List of heavyweight boxing champions

References

External links 

 Boxing: Australian National Boxing Hall of Fame - Peter Jackson
 
 IBHOF / Peter Jackson
 
 
Jackson, Peter — Brisbane City Council Grave Location Search

1861 births
1901 deaths
20th-century deaths from tuberculosis
Australian male boxers
Australian people of Cruzan descent
Australian people of Jamaican descent
Bare-knuckle boxers
Burials at Toowong Cemetery
Commonwealth Boxing Council champions
Danish emigrants to Australia
Heavyweight boxers
Infectious disease deaths in Queensland
International Boxing Hall of Fame inductees
People from Saint Croix, U.S. Virgin Islands
Tuberculosis deaths in Australia
United States Virgin Islands male boxers
World colored heavyweight boxing champions
Australian waterside workers